Corral de Calatrava is a municipality in Ciudad Real, Castile-La Mancha, Spain. It has a population of 1,272.

Municipalities in the Province of Ciudad Real